Harry Morgan Gowdy (August 24, 1889 – August 1, 1966) was an American professional baseball catcher, first baseman, manager and coach who played in the major leagues for the New York Giants and the Boston Braves. He was a member of the  "Miracle" Boston Braves.

He was the first active major league player to enlist for service in World War I, and the only player to fight in both World War I and World War II.

Background
Gowdy was born in Columbus, Ohio. He graduated from Columbus North High School in 1908.

He and his wife Pauline had no children.

A nephew, Pat Bonaventura, is completing a book about Gowdy's life.

Major League career
Gowdy made his major league debut with John McGraw's New York Giants in 1910, before being traded to Boston the next year. He did not see much playing time and spent the majority of the 1913 season with the Buffalo Bisons in the International League. In 1914, Gowdy became the Braves regular catcher in a year that saw them go from last place to first in two months, becoming the first team to win a pennant after being in last place on the Fourth of July. In the 1914 World Series, he had a .545 batting average, including the only home run of the series, in the historic upset of Connie Mack's Philadelphia Athletics. Gowdy had 50,000 fans celebrate him in a parade in his hometown of Columbus, Ohio that October.

Gowdy saw more playing time in subsequent seasons, but when World War I broke out, he became the first major league player to enlist. He saw considerable action in France with the 166th Infantry Regiment of the Ohio National Guard, including some of the worst trench fighting in the war. Four years later, he was traded back to the Giants, where he played in the 1923 and 1924 World Series, but his heroics weren't repeated, as he committed a costly error which led to the game-winning run in Game 7 of the 1924 series against the Washington Senators. In , the Giants released him. Four years later, he made a comeback with the Braves, albeit with very limited playing time. He then became a coach with the Giants, Braves, and the Reds. Later he left his coaching job to serve as an Army captain in World War II at the age of 53 and is believed to be the only big league baseball player to serve in both world wars.

Career statistics
In a seventeen-year major league career, Gowdy played in 1,050 games, accumulating 738 hits in 2,735 at bats for a .270 career batting average along with 21 home runs and 322 runs batted in. He ended his career with a .975 fielding percentage. Gowdy twice led the National League in caught stealing percentage. His 52.58% career caught stealing percentage ranks him sixth in major league history. Gowdy's reputation as a defensive stand out is enhanced because of the era in which he played. In the Deadball Era, catchers played a huge defensive role, given the large number of bunts and stolen base attempts, as well as the difficulty of handling the spitball pitchers who dominated pitching staffs.

Coaching career
When the United States entered World War II, Gowdy enlisted again at the age of 53, and was promoted to major. In December 1944, he returned to Fort Benning, where he served as Chief Athletic Officer. The baseball field at Fort Benning bears his name. By 1948, he had retired from baseball.

Unsuccessful Hall of Fame bid
Gowdy has the record for most unsuccessful Hall of Fame induction attempts, without ever having been enshrined in the Hall. While current custom limits the times a player can appear on the ballot to 10, Gowdy received votes 17 years, never being elected to the Hall of Fame (Edd Roush has the record for most Hall attempts with 19, but he was later enshrined by the Veteran's Committee).

Gowdy died at his home in Columbus, Ohio at age 76. Gowdy Field in Columbus is named in his honor.

References

External links

 
 

1889 births
1966 deaths
New York Giants (NL) players
New York Giants (NL) coaches
Boston Rustlers players
Boston Braves players
Boston Braves coaches
Cincinnati Reds managers
Cincinnati Reds coaches
Cleveland Indians scouts
Lancaster Lanks players
Dallas Giants players
Buffalo Bisons (minor league) players
Columbus Senators players
Rochester Red Wings players
United States Army personnel of World War I
United States Army personnel of World War II
Major League Baseball catchers
Baseball players from Columbus, Ohio
United States Army officers
Ohio National Guard personnel